The 1991 Illinois Fighting Illini football team represented the University of Illinois at Urbana-Champaign as a member of the Big Ten Conference the 1991 NCAA Division I-A football season. The Fighting Illini were led by fourth-year head coach John Mackovic during the regular season before he resigned and was replaced by Lou Tepper as interim head coach for the team's bowl game. Illinois compiled an overall record of 6–6 with a mark of 4–4 in conference play, placing fifth in the Big Ten. The Fighting Illini were invited to the John Hancock Bowl, where they lost to UCLA. The team's offense scored 264 points while the defense allowed 188 points. Illinois played home games at Memorial Stadium in Champaign, Illinois.

Schedule

Roster

1992 NFL Draft

References

Illinois
Illinois Fighting Illini football seasons
Illinois Fighting Illini football